NRSC may refer to:

National Radio Systems Committee
National Remote Sensing Centre
National Republican Senatorial Committee